Kenny Ho Kar-king (born 29 December 1959) is a Hong Kong actor and Cantopop/Mandopop singer. He was best known for his role as Zhan Zhao in the Taiwanese and Mainland Chinese television series Justice Bao from 1993 to 2012, and is also known for his roles in Master Ma and Super Hero. Ho is currently a businessman.

Early life
Ho was born in British Hong Kong on 29 December 1959. He had an elder brother and sister. Ho's parents had since divorced. Ho wanted to be a football player at the university but he failed to qualify for the role. He also studied acting at Beijing University before joining the Shaw Brothers.

Career 
Ho enrolled in ATV's training institute in 1982 and officially became an ATV actor after signing a contract with the company the following year. He starred in various ATV dramas, most notably the series The Blood Sword in 1990 and 1991, adapted from Ma Wing-shing's manhua series Chinese Hero: Tales of the Blood Sword.

In 1988, Ho shifted his acting career to Taiwan and starred in his first Taiwanese television series, Eight Thousand Li of Cloud and Moon as the famous military general, Yue Fei (岳飛). The show was an instant hit and Ho became a household name. He continued making many television dramas produced by CTS, including Endless Love (不了情) opposite May Chin, Hongchen Youai (紅塵有愛), Shaonian Zhang Sanfeng (The Young Zhang Sanfeng) (少年張三豐), and The Book and the Sword. He has obtained a great level of fame in the Asian community for his portrayal as Zhan Zhao (展昭) in the 1993 Taiwanese television series Justice Bao. In 1994 he reprised his respective role as Zhan Zhao in 包 青 天 之 滳 血 紅 梅. All the original cast from Taiwan as well as new TVB actresses such as Vivian Chow and Esther Kwan was involved.

Ho starred in several films in the 1990s including Dragon in Jail opposite Andy Lau, Family Affairs, Red Zone, and Red Wolf. In 1997, he starred in the Taiwanese drama the Bodyguards series: Jade Dolls, Cryptic Crystal, and Heavenly Charm.

In 2009, he acted in the mainland Chinese television series Justice Bao. In the same year, he played "Nameless" in the Hong Kong wuxia fantasy film The Storm Warriors.

In 2010, he starred in the film Love Cuts with Singaporean actress Zoe Tay. He recently appeared in Treasure Inn alongside Nicholas Tse, Charlene Choi, and Nick Cheung.

Ho eventually went into the business field, and in 2014 he was appointed a "Tourist Embassidor" of Huei Zhou, where he opened a health food company called Jing Jia Zhuang (勁家莊), based on his last name. Ho promotes healthy eating and healthy living. Due to running his business, he suspended most his acting and singing work, with the exception of Justice Bao and occasional show performances in China. Ho has moved away from acting and singing since then.

Personal life 
Ho was in a relationship with the then Taiwanese actress May Chin. They first met on the set of the Taiwanese drama Endless Love in 1989. They began dating in the early 1990s and separated in 1993, and still remain good friends. The two agreed that if they are still single by the age of 60, then they would spend the rest of their lives together.

He was in relationship with Anita Lee. The pair met in Taiwan while filming in 1998. They separated after 4 years together in 2001.

Ho is currently single and has no children.

Filmography

Films

Television

References

External links 

 Official Blog
 Official Weibo (Microblog)

1959 births
Living people
Hong Kong Buddhists
20th-century Hong Kong male actors
21st-century Hong Kong male actors
Asia Television
People from Enping